Typhoon Pongsona was the last typhoon of the 2002 Pacific typhoon season, and was the second costliest United States disaster in 2002, only behind Hurricane Lili. The name "Pongsona" was contributed by North Korea for the Pacific tropical cyclone list and is the Korean name for the garden balsam. Pongsona developed out of an area of disturbed weather on December 2, and steadily intensified to reach typhoon status on December 5. On December 8 it passed through Guam and the Northern Mariana Islands while near its peak winds of  10-min). It ultimately turned to the northeast, weakened, and became extratropical on December 11.
Typhoon Pongsona produced strong wind gusts peaking at  1-min), which left the entire island of Guam without power and destroyed about 1,300 houses. With strong building standards and experience from repeated typhoon strikes, there were no fatalities directly related to Pongsona, although there was one indirect death from flying glass. Damage on the island totaled over $730 million (2002 USD, $  USD), making Pongsona among the five costliest typhoons on the island. The typhoon also caused extreme damage on Rota and elsewhere in the Northern Mariana Islands, and as a result of its impact the name was retired.

Meteorological history

Satellite imagery indicated broad cyclonic turning in the lower levels of the atmosphere, and a trough was located near the surface. The disturbance developed rainbands and gradually became better organized. By December 2, the system had an elongated low-level circulation, located to the south of the convection. Shortly thereafter, the Joint Typhoon Warning Center (JTWC) issued a Tropical Cyclone Formation Alert, and at 1800 UTC on December 2 the agency classified the system as Tropical Depression 31W. Initially the depression moved to the west-northwest, and early on December 3 the JTWC classified the system as a tropical storm.

It turned to the west on December 4, due to a ridge to the north. It slowly intensified, developing an eye feature on December 5.

While continuing generally to the west, the eye of Pongsona gradually became better organized. A baroclinic cyclone east of Japan weakened the ridge, which caused the typhoon to turn more to the northwest. After the typhoon underwent rapid deepening, the JTWC estimated that Pongsona reached peak winds of  1-min sustained), making it a supertyphoon. At 0500 UTC on December 8, the eyewall made landfall on Guam, and two hours later the northern portion of the eyewall crossed over nearby Rota. Around that time, the JMA estimated Pongsona attained a peak intensity of  10-min winds) just to the north of Guam. The typhoon turned to the north-northwest through a weakness in the subtropical ridge a short distance west of the Northern Mariana Islands. On December 9, convection began to weaken as Pongsona began interacting with a mid-latitude system to its north. Dry air became entrained in the southwestern portion of the circulation, and the circulation became exposed from the diminishing convection.

Preparations
The National Weather Service in Guam issued a tropical storm watch for the Marshall Islands shortly after Pongsona developed into a tropical storm, and a day later watches were issued for Chuuk. On December 5, the service issued tropical storm warnings for parts of the Federated States of Micronesia. As Pongsona became a typhoon, the Guam National Weather Service office issued a typhoon watch for Guam, Rota, Saipan, and Tinian, which was upgraded to a typhoon warning about 23 hours prior to the onset of tropical storm-force winds; typhoon warnings were also issued for the unpopulated island of Aguigan. By one day before the typhoon moved through the Mariana Islands, JTWC predicted Pongsona to pass well east of the area. Despite a more westward track than anticipated, forecasts remained stagnant until the morning of December 8, when forecasters reluctantly predicted much greater threat to the Mariana Islands. As a result, many citizens felt they were unprepared and insufficiently warned for the typhoon.

Nine shelters throughout the Northern Mariana Islands were opened to accommodate families needing assistance. Several schools opened classrooms as evacuation centers. On Guam, ten schools were used as shelters, and on the day of impact 2,271 people were in shelters. On Rota, 159 people sought shelter, and in Saipan, 549 were in shelters by the day of impact. The Guam Memorial Hospital officials advised all pregnant women within 32 weeks of their delivery date to check in. The Guam Office of Civil Defense filed the paperwork for the Federal Emergency Management Agency to declare the island a disaster area. Governor Carl T.C. Gutierrez took similar measures to declare a state of emergency for the area. Following experience from previous typhoons, Guam newspaper Pacific Daily News underwent preparations to provide internet updates for the storm, including reinforcing the building, maintaining sufficient food supplies for the staff, and stationing two reporters elsewhere on the island; the paper was the only immediate source of information about the typhoon outside of Guam.

Impact

Federated States of Micronesia
Early in its duration, Pongsona first affected Pohnpei as a tropical storm. There, it produced heavy rains and gusty winds, though little damage was reported. Later, it brought tropical storm force winds to Chuuk. High waves from the storm washed over and covered some atolls.

Guam

Communications on the island failed due to the winds; the entire island was left without power and phone service. The winds greatly damaged 715 power poles and 513 transformers, leaving about $52 million in electrical damage reported (2002 USD$,   USD). The local weather office's communication link was cut off after flooding damaged a telecommunication facility, causing the National Weather Service in Honolulu, Hawaii, to provide backup support by temporarily issuing warnings and advisories. Many anemometers near the northern coastline failed from the winds. The winds collapsed several walls at the Guam Memorial Hospital, resulting in major damage throughout the northern two-thirds of the facility and several units being shut down. Several hotels, churches, and schools received moderate damage, and the Antonio B. Won Pat International Airport received damage to navigation equipment. Typhoon Pongsona also left 65% of the island's water wells inoperable, with most of Guam left without water service following the storm. Officials estimate the typhoon destroyed 1,300 homes, severely damaged 1,825, and lightly damaged 4,800.

The precipitation led to record river flow on the Pago and Asan Rivers; overflown rivers caused damage to some roads and bridges. The rainfall also caused extensive flooding in several villages. The combination of strong storm surge and rough waves caused considerable beach erosion and severe coastal damage.

Across Guam, damage totaled over $700 million (2002 USD$,   USD), placing it among the five costliest typhoons on the island. The typhoon injured 193 people, as reported by the Guam Department of Health; most were lacerations and fractures caused by flying glass and other debris. There was one indirect death attributed to the storm, when a 71-year-old woman was cut by flying glass and subsequently suffered a fatal heart attack; medical help could not reach her due to the intensity of the storm. As six typhoons had passed directly over the island during the previous ten years, officials in Guam enacted strong building standards, keeping deaths and injuries to a minimum. The typhoon was considered by the public the worst typhoon to ever strike the island due to the large eye affecting most of the population.

Northern Mariana Islands

The combination of winds and other effects from the typhoon destroyed 114 houses, severely damaged 154, and caused minor damage to 306; on the island, about 200 families were left homeless. The surge caused moderate beach erosion on the island, and destroyed a fuel pier and a loading pipeline. Additionally, the typhoon caused severe crop damage on the island. In all, the typhoon caused ten minor injuries on Rota, and resulted in over $30 million in damage (2002 USD$,   USD).

On Tinian, the passage of Pongsona destroyed two homes; seven received major damage and another eight sustained minor damage. The winds damaged power lines, causing two island-wide power outages. Major crop damage was reported.

On Saipan, two houses were destroyed and fifteen were damaged, seven severely. Six minor injuries were reported, and damage totaled about $100,000 (2002 USD$,   USD).

Aftermath

On the same day that Typhoon Pongsona struck Guam, President George W. Bush declared the island a major disaster area. Around the time of the cyclone passing over the island, 2,271 residents were in shelters, and by the next day it increased to 3,467 after people discovered their homes were uninhabitable. With thirteen Red Cross shelters across Guam, most remained in shelters for about three weeks before disaster tents were distributed. The American Red Cross worked with the United States Department of Agriculture to provide meals for shelter attendees for a two-week period following the typhoon. Through the collaboration of federal and other agencies, disaster assistance on Guam totaled over $300 million (2003 USD, $335 million 2007 USD) by 100 days after the typhoon struck, including $60 million (2002 USD$,   USD) in initial disaster response. Nearly 29,000 individuals registered for disaster assistance, with the first assistance check arrived ten days after the disaster declaration. By three months after the storm, the United States Small Business Administration approved $130 million (2003 USD$,   USD) in low-interest loans.

During the height of the typhoon at Cabras Island on Guam, a gasoline tank caught fire, believed to be from friction caused by extremely high winds running through its ventilation system. The tank exploded, sending its lid airborne and spreading the fire to other nearby tanks. The proximity of the tanks as well as low water pressure hampered firefighting efforts, and the fire was extinguished five days later; it resulted in three destroyed gasoline tanks with two more caught on fire.

On December 11, 2002, President Bush extended the disaster declaration to include the Northern Mariana Islands, which allocated emergency disaster aid for the territory. The declaration provided funding for 75% of the budget for debris removal and emergency protective measures. Immediately following the typhoon, FEMA assigned various federal agencies to respond to the island of Rota. Military personnel were transported to assist in recovery efforts. By four months after the typhoon, 749 individuals on the island registered through FEMA's teleregistration number. The United States Small Business Administration approved 147 low– interest loans for $9.1 million (2003 USD$,   USD) to individuals and businesses and for economic injury on Rota. In all, disaster aid to Rota totaled $17.4 million (2003 USD$, . Additionally, President Bush authorized disaster assistance for the Federated States of Micronesia.

Retirement

Due to the damage resulted from the storm, the name Pongsona was retired during the 38th session of the Economic and Social Commission for Asia and the Pacific and World Meteorological Organization typhoon committee in November 2005; it was replaced with the name Noul.

See also

Typhoon Dolphin (2015)
Typhoon Keith

References

External links

RSMC Tokyo - Typhoon Center
Best Track Data of Typhoon Pongsona (0226) 
Best Track Data (Graphics) of Typhoon Pongsona (0226)
Best Track Data (Text)
JTWC Best Track Data of Super Typhoon 31W (Pongsona)

2002 Pacific typhoon season
Retired Pacific typhoons
Typhoons
Typhoons in Guam
Typhoons in the Northern Mariana Islands
December 2002 events in Oceania
Pongsona